Hani Al-Dobaini (born June 25, 1984) is a Saudi football player who plays a forward.

References

1984 births
Living people
Saudi Arabian footballers
Al-Fateh SC players
Damac FC players
Al-Adalah FC players
Saudi First Division League players
Saudi Professional League players
Saudi Second Division players
Saudi Fourth Division players
Association football forwards
Saudi Arabian Shia Muslims